Bolen is a surname. Notable people with the surname include:

Bob Bolen (1926–2014), American politician and businessman
Brad Bolen (born 1989), American judoka
Brock Bolen (born 1985), American football player
Cheryl Bolen, American writer, educator and journalist
Dave Bolen (1923–2022), American sprinter, businessman, and diplomat
Jean Shinoda Bolen (born 1936), American psychiatrist and writer
Lin Bolen (1941–2018), American television executive and producer
Marcie Bolen (born 1977), American guitarist
Skip Bolen, American photographer
Stew Bolen (1902–1969), American baseball player

Fictional characters:
Angie Bolen, character in the television series Desperate Housewives